Marçal Aquino (born 1958) is a Brazilian novel writer, screenwriter and journalist.

Biography
He spent his childhood in Amparo, a city the countryside of São Paulo, graduating in journalism from the Pontifical Catholic University of Campinas (PUC / Campinas)  in 1983. In 1984 he published his first book of poems, A depilação da noiva no dia do casamento. After moving to the city of São Paulo, he began working as a journalist for media like Gazeta Esportiva and O Estado de S. Paulo. Since 1988, working as a police reporter at the Jornal da Tarde, a fact that will influence his later work.

He released its first book of  short stories, As fomes de setembro in 1991 to get the 5th Biennial Nestlé Prize in Literature. In 1994, Aquino writes the script for Os Matadores film directed by Beto Brant (1965). In 2001, he was awarded the Jabuti Prize for the work  O amor e outros objetos pontiagudos  (2001). In 2002 he published the novel O Invasor, and the screenplay for the eponymous film, also directed by Brant. In 2005 he published the novel Eu receberia as piores notícias dos seus lindos lábios,  again turned into a film by the same director, in 2012.

Works

Prose
 O Invasor (2002, relaunched in 2011)
 Faroestes
 O Amor e Outros Objetos Pontiagudos (Prêmio Jabuti 2000)
 As Fomes de Setembro (Prêmio V Bienal Nestlé de Literatura – Conto (1991)
 Miss Danúbio (Prêmio do Concurso de Contos do Paraná)
 Cabeça a Prêmio (2003)
 Famílias Terrivelmente Felizes (2003)
 Eu Receberia as Piores Notícias dos seus Lindos Lábios (2005)

Poetry
 Abismos – Modo de Usar
 Por Bares Nunca Antes Naufragados

Youth literature
 O Mistério da Cidade-Fantasma
 O Jogo do Camaleão
 O Primeiro Amor e Outros Perigos
 A Turma da Rua Quinze
 Coleção Sete Faces

TV screenwriting
 O Caçador
 Força Tarefa

Film screenwriting
 Os Matadores
 Ação entre Amigos
 O Invasor
 Nina
 O Cheiro do Ralo
 Eu Receberia as Piores Notícias dos Seus Lindos Lábios

References

1958 births
Living people
Brazilian male writers
Brazilian screenwriters
Brazilian journalists
Male journalists
People from Amparo, São Paulo